Max I. Silber (February 15, 1911 – June 15, 2004) was an American businessman from New Hampshire who through his philanthropic works became not only a formative figure for Boy Scouting in New Hampshire, but a distinguished citizen of his home state. A devout Jew, Silber was an active supporter of religious Scouting programs, and was distinguished not just by the Jewish Committee of Scouting, but by the Roman Catholic Committee on Scouting as well. Perhaps the most famous endeavor of Silber's was the development of his "friendship gifts" which were most commonly belt buckles made of bronze. These buckles have evolved into popular Scouting collectibles.

Early life
Max I. Silber was born in Manchester, New Hampshire, in 1911.  At the age of 14, he became a member of Boy Scout Troop 1 in Manchester. Silber earned his Eagle Scout in 1936, the Explorer Scout Ranger Award, and was recognized as a Vigil Honor member of the Order of the Arrow in 1958.

Personal life
Max married Edith Kamenske in June 1934. Their marriage lasted 65 years until her death in May 2000. One of their children, Allan, succeeded Max as the president of Kamenske & Company, but died after a long battle with Hodgkin's lymphoma in August 2003. Silber was a 60-year member of Ancient York Lodge #89, Free & Accepted Masons, in Nashua, N.H. Silber died on June 15, 2004 in Nashua, New Hampshire. He is buried along with his wife Edith and son Allan at the Temple Beth Abraham Cemetery in Nashua, New Hampshire.

Scouting
After 1929 Max became a Scout leader, eventually becoming a Scoutmaster. During his tenure, Silber influenced the lives of many young adults including future U.S. Senator Warren Rudman.  His involvement with Scouting beyond his troop was extensive, holding many positions, including unit commissioner, district commissioner, council commissioner, district chairman and council president. He was a member of the council executive board for 65 years. Silber served as the Region One chairman in 1957 and on regional jamboree committees in 1960, 1964, 1969, 1973, and 1977. He also served on the Jewish Relationships Committee of the BSA National Council and on the National Jewish Committee on Scouting.

In recognition of Silber's service, he was awarded the Silver Beaver, Silver Antelope, and Silver Buffalo awards and the Distinguished Eagle Scout Award. He was also awarded both the Jewish Shofar award, and the Roman Catholic St. George Award as testament to his hard work to promote Scouting to those of any faith.

Buckles for Friendship

Perhaps the most famous contribution to Scouting that Silber has become known for were his belt buckles. In 1950, Max was chosen to be a Scoutmaster for the National Scout Jamboree. He was in the metal ingot business and had souvenir buckles produced for the event which he gave out as friendship gifts. Over the next half century, he made fifty more buckles for national Scout jamboree, world jamborees, New Hampshire jamborees and other special occasions as well as recognition buckles for significant awards such as Eagle Scout, Vigil Honor, and Wood Badge. His buckles have become world-famous and are considered highly prized collectors' items. Amongst collectors, some of the Silber buckles fetch prices in the hundreds of dollars as evidenced on auction sites such as eBay.

The tradition of creating buckles was carried on by the museum he founded, the Lawrence L. Lee Scouting Museum, in cooperation with his daughter, Natalie Weil of Southport, North Carolina, and artist Rob Hoitt, formerly of Manchester. They produced two official "Max" buckles (2005, 2007). Starting in the 1990s (though there are some earlier examples), Silber started the tradition of offering two versions of each buckle. One version was made from a nickel-silver bronze, and issued as a collector's edition of the buckle. The second, was generally offered in red bronze and issued as a contingent version of the buckle, which for national and world jamborees are given to the contingent of the Daniel Webster Council, any buckles left over after this are also made available to the public in a limited edition. In 2007, Hoitt proposed a one-time change in the tradition of red bronze buckles to commemorate the 100th anniversary of Scouting's founding. The contingent buckle for the 21st World Scout Jamboree was made of polished naval brass with a royal blue lacquer.

In 2010, to commemorate the 100th anniversary of the BSA, and the 60th anniversary of Max's buckles, the Lawrence L. Lee Scouting Museum, again in cooperation with his daughter, issued what would be the last Max Silber "event" buckle. The buckle is a replica of the first Max buckle, the "half-moon" cast in 1950, and replacing the 'New Hampshire' was 'BSA,' a Scout fleur-de-lis, and a '100.' A limited supply of the buckles were cast and they were all in red bronze. Each Scout and leader who attended the Centennial Jamboree at Fort A.P. Hill, Virginia, received a buckle as a gift of the museum. The remaining buckles were made available by the museum and sold out by early 2011.

There are also several collectors buckles made to commemorate specific milestones such as Silver Beaver, Eagle Scout, Wood Badge and Order of the Arrow Vigil Honor, or programs such as the Exploring Division, Region One, Northeast Region, and two Camp Carpenter buckles amongst others. Some of these buckles were released in unlimited editions to act as a constant fundraiser to sustain the Lawrence L. Lee Scout Museum where they are exclusively available.

The buckles

† There may also exist "flat cast" test samples or limited variations in metals used for testing purposes, as these were not considered "official." In the cases of the 1950 and 1953 National Jamborees, there was an initial run in brass as well; which according to folklore was made from the many .22 shells littering the ground in the rifle range at Camp Carpenter.
* The 1979 Iran buckles were for the most part melted down. The number reflected is of those that are known to remain.

The museum and library
The Lawrence L. Lee Scouting Museum, established in 1969, was a place for Max to display Scouting Memorabilia that he acquired during his many trips nationally and internationally in the service of Scouting, including many items related to Lord Robert Baden-Powell, the founder of the Scouting Movement, and his wife Lady Olave Baden-Powell, with whom he was personally acquainted. In 1978, a Scouting Library was named for him to honor his contributions to Scouting and the community.  The museum has grown through donations from Scouters, families of Scouters and visitors to include one of the largest collections of Scouting memorabilia.  The museum has also traditionally hosted a Jamboree on the Air station, as well as hosting the New England Tradeoree each fall.

Professional life

Professionally, Max was the President of Kamenske & Company, a manufacturer of brass and bronze ingots.

Honors

Brandeis University in Waltham, MA confers the Max I. Silber Award to the university’s outstanding female student-athlete.
 The United Way of Greater Nashua, NH confers The Max I. Silber Community Service Award to members of the community who exemplify the ideals of community service and volunteerism.
 The National Eagle Scout Association chapter for New Hampshire is named The Max I. Silber Chapter.
 Camp Carpenter in Manchester, NH has a campsite named "Silber" in his honor.
 Max was awarded the Daniel Carter Beard Masonic Scouter Award in 2002 by the members of his lodge, Ancient York Lodge #89, F&AM and presented the award by the Grand Master of Masons in New Hampshire at the time, Most Worshipful Brother Wendell Lear Woodward.
 In 2004, Just after his death, the New Hampshire Scouting Service Club acquired the Amateur Radio Callsign 'N1S' (S being for Silber) for use during its Jamboree On The Air station, and dedicated the event to his memory. The club still uses the call each October to this day.

References

External links

 Max Silber Friendship Buckle History

1911 births
2004 deaths
20th-century American Jews
Businesspeople from New Hampshire
20th-century American businesspeople
21st-century American Jews